Keraj may refer to:
 Keraj, Fars
 Keraj Rural District, in Isfahan Province